Brooklands is the northernmost suburb of Christchurch, New Zealand. The settlement was built on former swamp land adjacent to Brooklands Lagoon, which forms part of the Waimakariri River mouth. The land damage sustained in the 2010 and 2011 Christchurch earthquakes and subsequent Red Zone classification resulted in the buyout and demolition of nearly all properties in Brooklands, effectively wiping the suburb off the map.

Geography
To the north, the Waimakariri River is the boundary.  Brooklands Lagoon is the eastern part of the suburb, facing Pegasus Bay and forming part of the Waimakariri River mouth.  The Styx River flows through Brooklands and into Brooklands Lagoon. Kainga is the semi-rural suburb to the west. Bottle Lake Forest is located to the south of Brooklands.

History

In the 1960s, Brooklands was a "ramshackle settlement of fibrolite houses", and well-built dwellings were "almost a talking point". Fifty years on, houses were much more substantial.

2010/11 earthquakes
The suburb was badly affected by the 2010 Canterbury earthquake and the February 2011 Christchurch earthquake, resulting in land subsidence and liquefaction.  As part of the ongoing earthquake recovery, the government announced on 17 November 2011 that the vast majority of Brooklands has been zoned red, meaning that those residential properties that have insurance would receive an offer for a government buyout of house and land.  The land is deemed uneconomic to repair whilst houses are on it and will thus be bought.  Some of the properties now condemned were built in 2011, and at least one house got its building consent from Christchurch City Council only after the February 2011 earthquake.

Olly Ohlson, known as the first Māori presenter to anchor a children's show, After School, and one of the strongest opponents of having the land red zoned, moved to Otago Peninsula at the end of 2013. As of 2015, the majority of properties in Brooklands have been demolished, leaving only 25 residents who refused the government land-buyout offers remaining in the area.

Demographics
It is part of the wider Brooklands-Spencerville statistical area.

Brooklands had a population of 129 at the 2018 New Zealand census, a decrease of 402 people (-75.7%) since the 2013 census, and a decrease of 951 people (-88.1%) since the 2006 census. There were 42 households. There were 63 males and 63 females, giving a sex ratio of 1.0 males per female. The median age was 45.4 years (compared with 37.4 years nationally), with 18 people (14.0%) aged under 15 years, 30 (23.3%) aged 15 to 29, 69 (53.5%) aged 30 to 64, and 15 (11.6%) aged 65 or older.

Ethnicities were 79.1% European/Pākehā, 11.6% Māori, 2.3% Pacific peoples, 11.6% Asian, and 2.3% other ethnicities (totals add to more than 100% since people could identify with multiple ethnicities).

Although some people objected to giving their religion, 51.2% had no religion, 30.2% were Christian and 2.3% had other religions.

Of those at least 15 years old, 21 (18.9%) people had a bachelor or higher degree, and 24 (21.6%) people had no formal qualifications. The median income was $37,100, compared with $31,800 nationally. The employment status of those at least 15 was that 66 (59.5%) people were employed full-time, 21 (18.9%) were part-time, and 3 (2.7%) were unemployed.

References

Suburbs of Christchurch